The La Grange Mine is a former mine located in Trinity County, California. At one time it was the largest hydraulic mine in California. Started operating in 1862, over 3,500,000 dollars of gold was extracted before it was closed down in 1918 due to rising costs of labor and steel after World War I. The quality of gold was low so hydraulic mining was used to take it from the ground. The site is now a California Historical Landmark.

The name comes from the owner who bought it in 1893, the French baron Ernest de la Grange. He came from North of France with his wife (Clémentine de Chaumont Quitry) and his two children (Emilie and Amaury de la Grange)

California Historical Landmark #778 reads:
NO. 778 LA GRANGE MINE (HYDRAULIC) - This mine, originally known as the Oregon Mountain Group of Claims, first operated about 1862. In 1892 the mine was purchased by the La Grange Hydraulic Gold Mining Company, which brought water from Stuart's Fork through 29 miles of ditch, tunnels, and flume to deliver it to the mine pit under a 650-foot head. Over 100,000,000 yards of gravel were processed to produce $3,500,000 in gold. Large-scale operations ceased in 1918.

See also
California Historical Landmarks in Trinity County, California
List of California Historical Landmarks

References

External links 
 Snowcrest.net: The La Grange Mine
 Dot.ca.gov: La Grange Historical Site

Gold mines in California
Weaverville, California
California Historical Landmarks
History of Trinity County, California
Buildings and structures in Trinity County, California
1862 establishments in California